Erik Zimen (1941-2003) was a Swedish behavioral scientist. He specialized in the behaviour of wolves and dogs, carrying out his research in Bavarian forests and the Parco Nazionale d'Abruzzo, Lazio e Molise, Italy. He is best known for his book The Wolf.

Zimen's research included a study of poodle-wolf mixes, called "puwos."

References 

Swedish scientists
1941 births
2003 deaths